Hiroshi Ikeda may refer to:

 Hiroshi Ikeda (aikidoka), Japanese aikido teacher
 Hiroshi Ikeda (director), Japanese film director